Iliya Mechkov (born 4 September 1969) is a Bulgarian fencer. He competed in the individual épée event at the 1996 Summer Olympics. Mechkov has been a coach at Windy City Fencing Academy in Chicago, Olympia Fencing Center in Cambridge, Massachusetts and currently coaches at Cavalier Fencing Club in Burlington, Massachusetts.

References

External links
 

1969 births
Living people
Bulgarian male épée fencers
Olympic fencers of Bulgaria
Fencers at the 1996 Summer Olympics
Sportspeople from Sofia